The 2017–2018 Toyota Finance 86 Championship is the fifth running of the Toyota Finance 86 Championship. The championship began on 4 November 2017 at Pukekohe Park Raceway and will conclude on 12 March 2018 at Hampton Downs Motorsport Park.

Teams and drivers 
All teams were New-Zealand registered.

Race calendar and results
All rounds are to be held in New Zealand. The first round in Pukekohe Park Raceway will be held in support of the Supercars Championship. Rounds 3, 4 and 5 are to be held with the Toyota Racing Series.

Championship standings
In order for a driver to score championship points, they had to complete at least 75% of the race winner's distance, and be running at the finish. All races counted towards the final championship standings.
The 2017–2018 New Zealand Toyota 86 Championship was won by Jack Milligan. 
The 2017–2018 New Zealand Toyota 86 Rookie Championship was won by Jordan Baldwin

Scoring system

References

External links
 

Toyota Finance 86 Championship
Toyota Finance 86 Championship
Toyota Finance 86 Championship